1976 Emmy Awards may refer to:

 28th Primetime Emmy Awards, the 1976 Emmy Awards ceremony honoring primetime programming
 3rd Daytime Emmy Awards, the 1976 Emmy Awards ceremony honoring daytime programming
 4th International Emmy Awards, the 1976 Emmy Awards ceremony honoring international programming

 
Emmy Award ceremonies by year